The Pakistan national cricket team toured Sri Lanka in 2000 to play a three-match Test series against Sri Lanka and the 2000 Singer Triangular Series, which also included South Africa. Pakistan won the Test series against Sri Lanka 2–0 with one match drawn.

Test series summary

1st Test

2nd Test

3rd Test

References

External links
 Pakistan in Sri Lanka Test Series, 2000
 Singer Triangular Series, 2000

2000 in Pakistani cricket
2000 in Sri Lankan cricket
International cricket competitions from 1997–98 to 2000
2000
Sri Lankan cricket seasons from 1972–73 to 1999–2000